Josef Ingman (born March 8, 1995) is a profession Swedish Ice Hockey player. He is currently playing for Brynäs IF in the Swedish hockey league (SHL). His youth team is Modo HK. He was born in Örnsköldsvik, Sweden.

References 

1995 births
Living people
Swedish ice hockey goaltenders
People from Örnsköldsvik Municipality
Sportspeople from Västernorrland County
21st-century Swedish people